Klaudia Anna Sosnowska (born April 6, 1990, in Frankfurt am Main) is a Polish basketball player playing the position of small forward. Since 2019, a player of SKK Polonia Warsaw, previously playing in the Women's Basket League in clubs: King Wilki Morskie Szczecin, Basket Konin, Widzew Łódź, TS Ostrovia Ostrów Wielkopolski, Energa Toruń i Ślęza Wrocław. As of 2019, a player of the Polish women's national team in 3x3 basketball, since 2021 Polish women's national team in 5x5 basketball.

Achievements
As of March 14, 2023, based on, unless otherwise noted.
Team
	Champion:
	Polish (2009, 2010)
  LOTTO 3×3 Women's League
	First Polish league (2021 – promotion to EBLK)
	Polish older juniors (U–20 – 2010)
   Bronze medal:
  European Women's Basketball League (2023)
	Polish championship (2018)
	Polish cup winner (2010, 2011)
	Finalist:
	Polish Cup (2009)
	Polish Super Cup (2008, 2009)
	Participant of the Euroleague games (2009/10 – TOP 16, 2010/11)
	Vice-champion of the first league (promotion to PLKK 2013, 2016)
	Winner of the tournament in Trutnov (2017)
Individual
	1st place in the FIBA-run world ranking of individual players playing 3×3 basketball (September 2021)
	MVP:
	I-League Group A regular season (2019, 2021)
	EBLK rounds (18 – 2021/2022)
	Participant in the Poland - FGE Stars match (2010)
	Best forward in the I league (2013 according to eurobasket.com) 
	Included in the 1st squad:
	I league:
	Group A (2019, 2020, 2021)
	Group B (2016)[15]
	2013, 2016 – via eurobasket.com
	EBLK rounds (18 – 2021/2022)
	Polish U-20 championship (2010)
National team
	European 3x3 basketball championship bronze (2022)
	Universiade (2013 – 11. miejsce)
	European Championships:
	U–20 (2009 – 5th place; 2010 – 9th place)
	U–18 (2008 – 8th place)
	U–16 (2006 – 6th place)

References

External links
Profile at eurobasket.com
Profile at fiba3x3.com

Living people
Polish women's basketball players
Small forwards
1990 births